Alice Vanderbilt Shepard Morris (December 7, 1874 – August 15, 1950) was a member of the Vanderbilt family. She co-founded the International Auxiliary Language Association (IALA).

Early life

Alice was born on December 7, 1874 in New York.  She was one of five daughters born to the former Margaret Louisa Vanderbilt (1845–1924) and, her husband, Elliot Fitch Shepard (1833–1893). Her mother was the eldest daughter of William Henry Vanderbilt and Maria Louisa (née Kissam) Vanderbilt. Her father was a lawyer, banker, and owner of the Mail and Express newspaper, as well as a founder and president of the New York State Bar Association.

Alice was known to her family as "Angela" because of the sweetness of her disposition and the beauty of her face, well-demonstrated by her attached portrait. She was no true angel, however, and climbed a tree against her father's specific interdiction and fell out fracturing her thoracic spine. Her father, a hard man, refused to call the doctor to punish her disobedience. She grew up deformed in Woodlea, a mansion on the Hudson now occupied as the clubhouse of the Sleepy Hollow Country Club.  Among her siblings was sister Edith Shepard and brother Elliot Fitch Shepard Jr.

Education and work
She attended the Radcliffe College of Harvard University. She was an honorary member of the Phi Beta Kappa society. She also received an honorary doctorate in Literary Science from Syracuse University "as special recognition of the field of study that you have made your own, the field of the international auxiliary language." She was Vice President of the World Service Council of the YWCA United States.

From her youth, Morris was troubled by ill health and was forced to spend much of her time on a sofa. Despite her illness, she initiated what was probably the most extensive linguistic research undertaken to date. During her stay at a clinic, Morris found a brochure on the artificial language Esperanto. She became interested in the idea of a neutral auxiliary language that could facilitate communication among diverse groups of people. Frederick Gardner Cottrell, later a well-known American chemist, persuaded Morris to tackle the problem of an auxiliary language, but objectively and scientifically.

In 1924, Morris and her husband founded the International Auxiliary Language Association (IALA). Morris had studied Esperanto, so the neutrality of IALA was often a dilemma for her. Nevertheless, she succeeded in remaining neutral. In 1945, she co-authored with Mary C. Bray the General Report of IALA. Morris was actively involved in the association – and remained its honorary Secretary – for the rest of her life.

Personal life

She was courted for some time by Dave Hennen Morris (1872–1944) who saw her face around the funnel of the steamer to France and knew at once that he must marry her. When he pursued her more closely, he saw that she had a deforming scoliosis which did not change his ardor one bit.  When he presented himself to her father to ask for her hand in marriage, he was told he would never amount to anything good and was asked to leave and have no further contact with the family.  When he was allowed to say good-bye to her in the hall, he asked her to elope with him.  She climbed out the window that night for an extraordinary life. Her sister later packed up her clothes in a trunk and sent them on by Railway Express. Mr. Shepard was infuriated at the insubordination of yet another daughter and refused to speak to her for a year, as the family story goes. Morris later became the U.S. Ambassador to Belgium from 1933 until 1937.

Dave was the son of John Albert Morris, a wealthy horseman, and Cora Hennen Morris, daughter of prominent New Orleans Judge Alfred Hennen. The couple, who married in 1895, had six children:

 Dave Hennen Morris Jr. (1900–1975), who married Alice Agnew in 1926. They divorced and he married Mary Josephine Dority (1907–1979).
 Louise Morris (1901–1976), who married Dudley Holbrook Mills (1894–1987) in 1922.
 Lawrence Morris (1903–1967), who married Ruth Spafford Whittmeyer, daughter of Joseph H. Spafford, in 1953.
 Noel Morris (1904–1928), who committed suicide at the age of twenty-four in 1928.
 Emily Hammond Morris (1907–1995), who married Hamilton Hadley (1896–1975), son of Arthur T. Hadley, President of Yale University, in 1929.
 Alice Vanderbilt Morris (1911–1986), who married Walter Knight Sturges, Jr. (1909–1992), an architect, in 1939.

Morris died in Bar Harbor, Maine in August 1950 at the age of 75. About six months later, the Interlingua-English Dictionary was published, presenting to the world her life's work, Interlingua.

In popular culture
In 1999, Julia S. Falk of Michigan State University published the book Women, Language and Linguistics – Three American Stories from the First Half of the Twentieth Century (320 pp.). The women portrayed were Gladys Amanda Reichard, E. Adelaide Hahn, and Alice Vanderbilt Morris.

See also
 
Interlingua
International Auxiliary Language Association

References

External links

Oil Portrait of Alice as a girl of 13, painted by John Singer Sargent
Oil Portrait of her mother Margaret, also painted by Sargent
Union Mundial pro Interlingua

1874 births
1950 deaths
Interlingua
Radcliffe College alumni
Alice
Women linguists
Burials at Moravian Cemetery